A nocturnal emission, informally known as a wet dream, sex dream, nightfall or sleep orgasm, is a spontaneous orgasm during sleep that includes ejaculation for a male, or vaginal wetness or an orgasm (or both) for a female. Nocturnal emissions happen after stressful dreams in REM sleep which activate the sympathetic nervous system hence leading to ejaculation. Nocturnal emissions are most common during adolescence and early young adult years, but they may happen any time after puberty. It is possible for men to wake up during a wet dream or simply to sleep through it, but for women, some researchers have added the requirement that she should also awaken during the orgasm and perceive that the orgasm happened before it counts as a wet dream. Vaginal lubrication alone does not mean that the woman has had an orgasm.

Composition
Due to the difficulty in collecting ejaculate produced during nocturnal emissions, relatively few studies have examined its composition. In the largest study, which included nocturnal emission samples from 10 men with idiopathic anejaculation, the semen concentration was equivalent to samples obtained from the same men by penile vibratory stimulation, although the proportions of sperm which were motile and which were of normal morphology were higher in the nocturnal emission specimens.

Frequency
In a detailed study, men and women reported that approximately 8% of their everyday dreams contain some form of sexual-related activity. 4% of sex dreams among both men and women resulted in orgasms.

In males
The frequency of nocturnal emissions is highly variable. Some reported that it is due to being sexually inactive for a period of 1–2 weeks, with no engagement in either intercourse or masturbation. Some males have experienced large numbers of nocturnal emissions as teenagers, while others have never experienced any. In the U.S., 83% of men experience nocturnal emissions at some time in their life. For males who have experienced nocturnal emissions, the mean frequency ranges from 0.36 times per week (about once every three weeks) for single 15-year-old males to 0.18 times per week (about once every five-and-a-half weeks) for 40-year-old single males. For married males, the mean ranges from 0.23 times per week (about once per month) for 19-year-old married males to 0.15 times per week (about once every two months) for 50-year-old married males. In some parts of the world, nocturnal emissions are more common. For example, in Indonesia surveys have shown that 97% of men experience nocturnal emissions by the age of 24.

Some males have the emissions only at a certain age, while others have them throughout their lives following puberty. The frequency with which one has nocturnal emissions has not been conclusively linked to frequency of masturbation. Alfred Kinsey found there may be "some correlation between the frequencies of masturbation and the frequencies of nocturnal emissions. In general the males who have the highest frequencies of nocturnal emissions may have somewhat lower rates of masturbation."

One factor that can affect the number of nocturnal emissions males have is whether they take testosterone-based drugs. In a 1998 study by Finkelstein et al, the number of boys reporting nocturnal emissions drastically increased as their testosterone doses were increased, from 17% of subjects with no treatment to 90% of subjects at a high dose.

Thirteen percent of males experience their first ejaculation as a result of a nocturnal emission. Kinsey found that males experiencing their first ejaculation through a nocturnal emission were older than those experiencing their first ejaculation by means of masturbation. The study indicates that such a first ejaculation resulting from a nocturnal emission was delayed a year or more from what would have been developmentally possible for such males through physical stimulation.

In females
In 1953, sex researcher Alfred Kinsey found that nearly 40% of the women he interviewed have had one or more nocturnal orgasms or wet dreams. Those who reported experiencing these said that they usually had them several times a year and that they first occurred as early as thirteen, and usually by the age of 21. Kinsey defined female nocturnal orgasm as sexual arousal during sleep that awakens one to perceive the experience of orgasm.

Research published by Barbara L. Wells in the 1986 Journal of Sex Research indicates that as many as 85% of women have experienced nocturnal orgasm by the age of 21. This research was based on women waking up with/during orgasm.

Studies have found that more males have more frequent spontaneous nocturnal sexual experiences than females. Female wet dreams may be more difficult to identify with certainty than male wet dreams because ejaculation is usually associated with male orgasm while vaginal lubrication may not indicate orgasm.

Cultural views

There are numerous cultural and religious views on nocturnal emissions. Below is a limited summary of some perspectives.

Antiquity
In ancient Rome, nocturnal emission was recorded by Lucretius in his De Rerum Natura (translated here by William Ellery Leonard):

Jewish and Samaritan

Some examples of passages under the Mosaic law of the Hebrew Bible teach that under the law of Moses, a man who had a nocturnal emission incurred ritual defilement (as with any other instance of ejaculation):

The first of these is part of a passage stating similar regulations about sexual intercourse and menstruation. Leviticus 12 makes similar regulations about childbirth.

A third passage relates more specifically to priests, requiring any "of the offspring of Aaron who has ... a discharge", among other causes of ritual defilement, to abstain from eating holy offerings until after a ritual immersion in a mikveh and until the subsequent night-fall.

In Judaism, the Tikkun HaKlali, also known as "The General Remedy", is a set of ten Psalms designed in 1805 by Rebbe Nachman, whose recital is intended to serve as repentance for nocturnal emissions.

Patristic Christian
Saint Augustine held that male nocturnal emissions, unlike masturbation, did not pollute the conscience of a man, because they were not voluntary carnal acts, and were therefore not to be considered a sin. It is the same with Aquinas, who wrote in the Summa Theologica II-II-154-5: "For there is no one who while sleeping does not regard some of the images formed by his imagination as though they were real, as stated above... ...Wherefore what a man does while he sleeps and is deprived of reason's judgment, is not imputed to him as a sin, as neither are the actions of a maniac or an imbecile."

Islamic
A wet dream (ihtilam) is not a sin in Islam. Moreover, whereas a person fasting (in Ramadan or otherwise) would normally be considered to have broken their fast by ejaculating on purpose (during either masturbation or intercourse), nocturnal emission is not such a cause. However, they are still required to bathe prior to undergoing some rituals in the religion.

Muslim scholars consider ejaculation something that makes one temporarily ritually impure, a condition known as junub, meaning that a Muslim who has had an orgasm or ejaculated must have a ghusl (consisting of ablution followed by bathing the entire body so that not a single hair remains dry on the whole body—may also require one to rub the body according to Maliki school of thought, dalk in Arabic—while showering) before they can read any verse of the Mushaf or perform the formal prayers. Informal supplications and prayers (du'a) do not require such a bath.

Indian traditions
The Hindu text Manusmriti suggests Brahmans who had nocturnal emissions to bathe and chant mantras praying to return their virility. Vinaya suggests masturbation is a sin, but a nocturnal emission is not. During the third Buddhist council, it was suggested that having wet dreams as an Arhat does not count as a sin.

Medieval Europe

In European folklore, nocturnal emissions were believed to be caused by a succubus copulating with the individual at night, an event associated with sleep paralysis and possibly night terrors.

East Asia
Traditional East Asian medicine considered it problematic, because it was considered to be an act of evil spirits that tries to rob the life of a person. The literature suggests a "cure" for nocturnal emissions, which prescribes fried leek seeds three times a day.

See also
Nocturnal penile tumescence
Nocturnal clitoral tumescence
Sleep sex
Somnophilia
Nocturnal enuresis

References

External links

Orgasm
Ejaculation
Sleep physiology
Sleep
Men's health
Succubi